The 2010–11 ISU World Standings and Season's World Ranking, are the World Standings and Season's World Ranking published by the International Skating Union (ISU) during the 2010–11 season.

The 2010–11 ISU World Standings for single & pair skating and ice dance, are taking into account results of the 2008–09, 2009–10 and 2010–11 seasons.

The 2010–11 ISU Season's World Ranking is based on the results of the 2010–11 season only.

The 2010–11 ISU World standings for synchronized skating, are based on the results of the 2008–09, 2009–10 and 2010–11 seasons.

World Standings for single & pair skating and ice dance

Season-end standings 
The remainder of this section is a complete list, by discipline, published by the ISU.

Men's singles (186 skaters)

Ladies' singles (212 skaters)

Pairs (92 couples)

Ice dance (124 couples)

Season's World Ranking 
The remainder of this section is a complete list, by discipline, published by the ISU.

Men's singles (117 skaters)

Ladies' singles (129 skaters)

Pairs (70 couples)

Ice dance (95 couples)

See also 
 ISU World Standings and Season's World Ranking
 List of highest ranked figure skaters by nation
 List of ISU World Standings and Season's World Ranking statistics
 2010–11 figure skating season
 2010–11 synchronized skating season

References

External links 
 International Skating Union
 ISU World standings for Single & Pair Skating and Ice Dance / ISU Season's World Ranking
 ISU World standings for Synchronized Skating

ISU World Standings and Season's World Ranking
Standings and Ranking
Standings and Ranking